An Akers' clasp is the classic direct retainer for removable partial dentures.   Named after its inventor, Polk E. Akers, this suprabulge clasp consists of a rest, a guide plate, a retentive arm and a reciprocal arm. Akers' clasps, as a rule, face away from an edentulous area. Should they face the edentulous area, they are termed reverse Akers' clasps.

References

Prosthodontology
Dental equipment